Tērvete Municipality is a former municipality in Semigallia, Latvia. The municipality was formed in 2002 by merging Augstkalne parish, Bukaiši parish and Tērvete parish, the administrative centre being Zelmeņi. The population in 2020 was 3,302.

On 1 July 2021, Tērvete Municipality ceased to exist and its territory was merged into Dobele Municipality.

Geography 
The largest rivers are Auce, Ālave, Govaine, Krievaine, Reņģe, Skujaine, Svēpaine, Svētaine, Svete, Tērvete.

History 
The county of Tērvete is located in the territory of the ancient Semigallian Territory, which was first mentioned in the Livonian Chronicle of Henry in the XXIII, section 4, in the context of the events of 1219, as the "province called Tervete" (Latin: provincia, que Thervetene vocatur ).

See also 
 Administrative divisions of Latvia

References

External links 
 

 
Former municipalities of Latvia